Luciano Molinari (1880–1940) was an Italian stage and film actor.

Selected filmography
 Il bacio di Cirano (1913)
 On with the Motley (1920)
 Five to Nil (1932)
 Three Lucky Fools (1933)
 Cardinal Lambertini (1934)

References

Bibliography
 Goble, Alan. The Complete Index to Literary Sources in Film. Walter de Gruyter, 1999.

External links

1880 births
1940 deaths
People from the Province of Pavia
Italian male film actors
Italian male stage actors